Roger Lee Cossack is a former legal analyst for ESPN, CNN, TruTV, and a Distinguished Visiting Practitioner in Residence at Pepperdine University School of Law.

Biography
Cossack graduated with a B.A. from UCLA and then graduated with a J.D. from the UCLA School of Law.

After school, he worked as a prosecutor in Los Angeles County, California. His employment with ESPN ended on April 26, 2017.

Cossack also argued in front of the United States Supreme Court in United States v. Leon, a landmark Fourth Amendment decision establishing the "good faith" exception to the Fourth Amendment exclusionary rule. A former CNN legal correspondent and anchor, Cossack was co-host of the award-winning legal issues program Burden of Proof with Greta Van Susteren.  Over the past decade, he has covered numerous cases, including trials involving O. J. Simpson, Kobe Bryant, Michael Vick, Barry Bonds, Bernie Fine, and Jerry Sandusky.  In 2019-2020 Cossack hosted OJ25, a retrospective series about the O. J. Simpson murder trial for Court TV.

External links
Roger Cossack ESPN Bio

References 

American television personalities
Male television personalities
American Jews
Living people
University of California, Los Angeles alumni
UCLA School of Law alumni
Year of birth missing (living people)